Sergey Anatolyevich Mitin (born 3 June 1980) is a Russian former professional association football player.

Club career
He played in the Russian Premier League for three seasons for FC Krylia Sovetov Samara and FC Amkar Perm.

References

External links
Career summary by sportbox.ru

1980 births
Living people
Russian footballers
Russian Premier League players
PFC Krylia Sovetov Samara players
FC Amkar Perm players
FC Ural Yekaterinburg players
FC Salyut Belgorod players
FC Volgar Astrakhan players
FC Arsenal Tula players
Sportspeople from Kaluga
FC Lokomotiv Kaluga players
Association football midfielders
FC Novokuznetsk players
FC Tekstilshchik Ivanovo players